The Deroplatyidae are a new (2019) family of praying mantises, based on the type genus Deroplatys.  As part of a major revision of mantis taxonomy, the subfamily Deroplatyinae has been moved here from the previously-structured family Mantidae.

The new placement is in superfamily Mantoidea (of group Cernomantodea) and infraorder Schizomantodea.  Genera in this family have been recorded from: Africa, India, Indochina and Malesia.

Subfamilies, tribes and genera  
The Mantodea Species File lists two subfamilies:

Subfamily Deroplatyinae
 tribe Deroplatyini (Asia)
 Deroplatys Westwood, 1839
 Mythomantis Giglio-Tos, 1916
 Pseudempusa Brunner v. W., 1893
 tribe Euchomenellini (Asia)
 Euchomenella Giglio-Tos, 1916
 Indomenella Roy, 2008
 Phasmomantella Vermeersch, 2018
 Tagalomantis Hebard, 1920

Subfamily Popinae

 tribe Leptocolini (Africa)
 subtribe Euchomenina
 Euchomena Saussure, 1870
 subtribe Leptocolina
 Afrothespis Roy, 2006
 Agrionopsis Werner, 1908
 Leptocola Gerstaecker, 1883
 Stenopyga Karsch, 1892
 tribe Popini (Africa)
 Danuria Stal, 1856
 †Lithophotina Sharov, 1962
 Macrodanuria Sjostedt, 1900
 Macropopa Giglio-Tos, 1914
 Neodanuria La Greca & Lombardo, 1986
 Popa Serville, 1839

References

External links 

Mantodea families
Deroplatyidae